Bob Welch: His Fleetwood Mac Years & Beyond was an album of rerecordings of songs by former Fleetwood Mac guitarist turned solo artist Bob Welch, released in 2003. As the title suggests, most of the songs were rerecordings of songs he had written and recorded both with Fleetwood Mac and solo. The album also contained a recording of "Oh Well", a Mac hit from before Welch's time in the group, that he sang many times after Peter Green's departure; and a brand new track, Like Rain. The album was re-released in 2008 as Greatest Hits & More - Revisited.

Track listing

Personnel

Musicians
 Bob Welch – all vocals & instruments

Technical

 Bob Welch – producer
 Eddie Wilner – executive producer

References

2003 albums
Bob Welch (musician) albums